Twilight of a Nation is a Hong Kong television series based on the events of the Taiping Rebellion and the rise and fall of the Taiping Heavenly Kingdom during the late Qing dynasty. The 45 episodes long series was produced by Siu Sang and was first aired on TVB Jade in Hong Kong in November 1988. It was broadcast again on TVB in 1996. The theme songs and insert songs in the series were performed by Roman Tam.

Plot
The story begins in the late Qing dynasty when the government is plagued by corruption and foreign powers threaten to carve up China. Hong Xiuquan (Hung Sau-chuen), born in an extremely poor Hakka family, participates in the imperial examination, hoping to pass and become a government official in order to provide for his family. He fails in each attempt and suffers from a nervous breakdown. Hong joins the Heaven and Earth Society later. One day, he has a revelation dream to spread Christianity and claims that he is the brother of Jesus Christ, and has been empowered by God to destroy the demons (referring to the Qing forces). After rallying a group of supporters, Hong started the God-Worshipping Society to spread his religious ideas. Hong has another dream again, in which he is bestowed with a superior divine sword, known as the "Demon-Slaying Sword". Hong leads his society to start the Taiping Rebellion against the Qing government and found the Taiping Heavenly Kingdom.

Cast
 Note: Some of the characters' names are in Cantonese romanisation.

 Ray Lui as Hung Sau-chuen (洪秀全)
 Felix Wong as Yeung Sau-ching (楊秀清)
 Li Kwok-lun as Fung Wan-san (馮雲山)
 Sean Lau as Siu Chiu-kwai (蕭朝貴)
 Chan Wing-chun as Wai Cheung-fai (韋昌輝)
 Newton Lai as Shek Tat-hoi (石達開)
 Aaron Kwok as Chun Yat-kong (秦日綱)
 Jimmy Au as Lee Sau-sing (李秀成)
 Lee Yiu-king as Chan Yuk-sing (陳玉成)
 Leung Kit-wah as So Fung (蘇鳳)
 Sheren Tang as Hon Bo-ying (韓寶英)
 Teresa Mo as Yip Ling (葉苓)
 Money Chan as Hung Suen-kiu (洪宣嬌)
 Kiki Sheung as To Wai-tsan (杜惠珍)
 Yung Wai-ma as Lai Suk-kuen (賴淑娟)
 Carrie Choi as Fu Sin-cheung (傅善祥)
 Michael Tao as Lee Chiu-sau (李昭壽)
 Bak Man-biu as Mung Dak-yan (蒙得恩)
 Chu Tit-wo as Law Tai-kong (羅大綱)
 Stella Wong as Yim Fu-yung (艷芙蓉)
 Leung Hung-wah as Hong Yan-fat (洪仁發)
 Chun Hung as Hung Yan-chung (洪仁忠)
 Ma Chung-tak as Lai Chung (賴忠)
 Ho Kwai-lam as Miu Pui-lam (苗佩霖)
 Lau Kong as Tsang Kwok-fan (曾國藩)
 Wong Wan-choi as Lee Hung-cheung (李鴻章)
 Bobby Au-yeung as Tsang Kwok-chuen (曾國荃)
 Alan Au as Tso Chung-tong (左宗棠)
 Cheung Ying-choi as To-kwong Emperor (道光)
 Nixon Pang as Ham-fung Emperor (咸豐)
 Mary Hon as Consort Yi (懿貴妃)
 Pau Fong as Lam Tsak-tsui (林則徐)
 Kong Ngai as Kei-ying (耆英)
 Stephan Yip as Chiu Sung-nin (趙崇年)
 Wilson Tsui as Kong Chung-yuen (江忠源)
 Chan Tik-hak as Heung Wing (向榮)
 Mak Chi-wan as Cheung Chiu (張釗)
 Fung Kwok as Tin Fong (田芳)
 Au Ngok as Kei-sin (琦善)
 Mak Ho-wai as Yik-san (奕山)
 Kwan Hoi-san as Squire See (施員外)
 Derek Kwok
 Wayne Lai

Production
The TV series took place in CCTV Nanhai Studio, Foshan, Guangdong, China.

See also
 The Taiping Heavenly Kingdom (TV series)

References

External links
 

TVB dramas
1988 Hong Kong television series debuts
1988 Hong Kong television series endings
Television series set in the Qing dynasty
1980s Hong Kong television series
Cantonese-language television shows